Carnegie Medal may refer to:

 Carnegie Medal (literary award), for children's literature
 Carnegie Medal for Excellence in Children's Video
 Andrew Carnegie Medals for Excellence in Fiction and Nonfiction
 Carnegie Hero Fund Carnegie Medal
 Andrew Carnegie Medal of Philanthropy
 Carnegie Prize (Carnegie Museum of Art)
 Carnegie Art Award (Swedish award, established 1998)